Dis Is da Drum is Herbie Hancock's thirty-ninth album and his first solo album since leaving Columbia Records. Guests include saxophonist Bennie Maupin, trumpeter Wallace Roney and flautist Hubert Laws.

Tracks like "Bo Ba Be Da" and "Dis Is da Drum" reflect  Hancock's move towards acid jazz, while "Butterfly" makes a fifth appearance on a Hancock album following the original album (Thrust), Kimiko Kasai's album (Butterfly), a live album (Flood), and another studio album (Direct Step).

Track listing

Personnel
 Herbie Hancock – piano (exc. 2, 3, 7), Minimoog and synthesizer (2, 5, 7, 8, 10, 11), clavinet (2, 5, 10, 11), synthesizer bass (2, 11), background vocals (4)
 Bill Summers – percussion (exc. 4, 7), bata (7)
 Will "Roc" Griffin – drum loops, sequencing (exc. 5, 7), sampling (exc. 5, 7, 9), programming (5, 7, 10, 11), rap (4)
 Darrell Smith – keyboards (1, 2, 8), sequencing (2, 8, 9, 10), electric piano (3, 4, 11), clavinet (3, 7), Minimoog (3), background vocals (4), programming (5-10), synthesizer (5, 9)
 Darrell "Bob Dog" Robertson – guitar (exc. 3, 6, 9), background vocals (4)
with
 Wah Wah Watson – guitar (1, 2, 8-11), vocals and sequencing (9)
 Mars Lasar – keyboards and sound design (1, 4, 6, 10, 11)
 Wallace Roney – trumpet (1, 8, 10, 11)
 Bennie Maupin – tenor saxophone (1, 8, 10, 11)
 Hubert Laws - flute (6)
 Lazaro Galarraga – vocals (2, 7), bata and vocal arrangement (7)
 Chill Factor – rap (4)
 The Real Richie Rich – DJ and scratcher (4)
 Francis Awe – vocals (5)
 Marina Bambino, Felicidad Ector, Lynn Lindsey, Yvette Summers, Louis Verdeaux - background vocals (2, 11)
 Huey Jackson - background vocals (2, 7, 11)
 Nengue Hernandez - background vocals (7)
 Frank Thibeaux – bass guitar (1)
 Armand Sabal Lecco - bass guitar (8, 10)
 Jay Shanklin – bass and add. sequencing (8)
 Ken Strong – drums (1, 2, 6-11)
 William Kennedy – drums (1, 7, 11)
 Guy Eckstine – drums (5)
 Niayi Asiedu – percussion (1)
 Airto Moreira – percussion (3)
 Munyungo Jackson and Skip Burney – djembe (5)
 Nengue Hernandez – bata (7)
 Brady Speller - percussion (11)
 Doug Scott - additional editing (2)
Rhythm arrangements credited to (as far as they are not identical to the writers credits)
"The Melody" - Darrell Smith, Will "Roc" Griffin
"Butterfly" - Bill Summers, Herbie Hancock, Mars Lasar
"Hump" - Bill Summers, Darrell "Bob Dog" Robertson, Darrell Smith, Jay Shanklin
"Rubber Soul" - Bill Summers, Herbie Hancock, Wah Wah Watson, Will "Roc" Griffin
"Bo Ba Be Da" - Darrell Smith, Herbie Hancock
Production, recording and mix by Bill Summers and Herbie Hancock with Darrell Robertson, Darrell Smith, Will Griffin.
Additional co-producer (6), additional engineer (1, 6, 10, 11) - Mars Lasar
Chief engineers - Darrell "Bob Dog" Robertson, Darrell Smith
Additional recordings at Studio 55 by Michael Schlessinger assisted by Darrell Roamer
Mastering – "Big Bass" Brian Gardner
Executive-Producer – Guy Eckstine

References

External links

1994 albums
Herbie Hancock albums
Post-bop albums
Verve Records albums
Mercury Records albums